Stefan Saliger (born 23 December 1967 in Limburg an der Lahn) is a German former field hockey player who competed in the 1992 Summer Olympics and in the 1996 Summer Olympics.

References

External links
 

1967 births
Living people
German male field hockey players
Olympic field hockey players of Germany
Field hockey players at the 1992 Summer Olympics
Field hockey players at the 1996 Summer Olympics
Olympic gold medalists for Germany
Olympic medalists in field hockey
Medalists at the 1992 Summer Olympics
1990 Men's Hockey World Cup players
People from Limburg an der Lahn
Sportspeople from Giessen (region)